The pyramid of Pharaoh Merenre was constructed for Merenre Nemtyemsaf I during the Sixth Dynasty of Egypt at Saqqara  to the south-west of the pyramid of Pepi I and a similar distance to the pyramid of Djedkare. Its ancient name was "Merenre's beauty shines" or perhaps "The Perfection of Merenre Appears". Today it consists mostly of ruins; it is hard to get to and is not open to the public.

The pyramid was built  in height,  in base length with an inclination of 53°07'48".

Only traces of the mortuary temple have been found and the evidence indicates that construction was halted abruptly at one point and never resumed, probably upon the pharaoh's death.

The entrance to the burial chambers is on the north face which descends to a vestibule where another shaft leads to the antechamber. To the right of the antechamber is the burial chamber; to the left is another small room, a serdab. In the burial chamber a sarcophagus decorated with polychrome reliefs stood against the wall; when found, it was in good condition although it had been plundered. The ceiling of the burial chamber had an astrological theme and was covered with stars.

Excavations 
The pyramid was first examined in the 1830s by John Perring. Later in the 1880s the subterranean chambers were explored by Gaston Maspero, who was in search of Pyramid Texts; his expedition discovered a mummy inside the pyramid. It was thought to be from some later burial, although some modern scholars now believe that it was the mummy of Merenre after all. If so, that would make it the oldest-known royal mummy. Since the late 20th century a French team led by Jean Leclant has been researching the site.

See also
Egyptian pyramid construction techniques
List of Egyptian pyramids
List of megalithic sites

References 

Pyramids of the Sixth Dynasty of Egypt
Saqqara